The 1990 King George VI and Queen Elizabeth Stakes was a horse race held at Ascot Racecourse on Saturday 28 July 1990. It was the 40th running of the King George VI and Queen Elizabeth Stakes.

The winner was Sheikh Mohammed's Belmez, a three-year-old bay colt trained at Newmarket, Suffolk by Henry Cecil and ridden by Mick Kinane. Belmez's victory gave his owner, trainer and jockey their first win in the race.

The contenders
The race attracted a field of eleven runners, ten trained in the United Kingdom and one trained in France. The only French challenger was the favourite In The Wings, the winner of the Coronation Cup and the Grand Prix de Saint-Cloud. In The Wings' owner, Sheikh Mohammed, was represented by two runners trained in England by Henry Cecil: Old Vic, the winner of the Prix du Jockey Club and Irish Derby in 1989 and Belmez, the winner of the Chester Vase. Other leading contenders were Cacoethes, who had been narrowly beaten by Nashwan in the previous year's King George who was accompanied by his pacemaker Limeburn and Terimon, who had finished second in the 1989 Epsom Derby and won the Earl of Sefton Stakes. The other runners included Sapience (Ebor Handicap, Princess of Wales's Stakes), Assatis (Gran Premio del Jockey Club, Hardwicke Stakes) and Legal Case (Champion Stakes). In The Wings headed the betting at odds of 3/1 ahead of Old Vic (4/1) and Cacoethes (11/2) with Belmez and Terimon on 15/2.

The race
Old Vic was sent into the lead by his jockey Steve Cauthen and set the pace from Limeburn. He maintained his advantage into the straight where he led from Belmez, Cacoethes, Assatis and In The Wings. Belmez took the lead with two furlongs to run but Old Vic rallied on the inside and the closing stages developed into a prolonged struggle between the two Henry-Cecil trained colts. Belmez prevailed by a neck, with Assatis finishing strongly to take third, a length and a half behind Old Vic. Cacoethes finished fourth ahead of In The Wings, Terimon and Charmer. There were long gaps back to Husyan and Sapience, with Legal Case and Limeburn bringing up the rear.

Race details
 Sponsor: De Beers
 Purse: £464,025; First prize: £284,715
 Surface: Turf
 Going: Good to Firm
 Distance: 12 furlongs
 Number of runners: 11
 Winner's time: 2:30.76

Full result

 Abbreviations: nse = nose; nk = neck; shd = head; hd = head; dist = distance; UR = unseated rider

Winner's details
Further details of the winner, Belmez
 Sex: Colt
 Foaled: 11 January 1987
 Country: United States
 Sire: El Gran Senor; Dam: Grace Note (Top Ville)
 Owner: Sheikh Mohammed
 Breeder: Darley Stud

References

King George
 1990
King George VI and Queen Elizabeth Stakes
King George VI and Queen Elizabeth Stakes
20th century in Berkshire